Pine Canyon is an unincorporated community and census-designated place (CDP) in Monterey County, California, just south of King City. As of the 2020 census, the population was 1,871.

Geography
Pine Canyon is in eastern Monterey County on the southwest side of the Salinas Valley.

Demographics
At the 2010 census Pine Canyon had a population of 1,822. The racial makeup of Pine Canyon was 1,173 (64.4%) White, 29 (1.6%) African American, 15 (0.8%) Native American, 18 (1.0%) Asian, 0 (0.0%) Pacific Islander, 490 (26.9%) from other races, and 97 (5.3%) from two or more races. Hispanic or Latino of any race were 984 people (54.0%).

The census reported that 1,816 people (99.7% of the population) lived in households, no one lived in non-institutionalized group quarters and 6 (0.3%) were institutionalized.

There were 554 households, 258 (46.6%) had children under the age of 18 living in them, 347 (62.6%) were opposite-sex married couples living together, 74 (13.4%) had a female householder with no husband present, 42 (7.6%) had a male householder with no wife present.  There were 31 (5.6%) unmarried opposite-sex partnerships, and 2 (0.4%) same-sex married couples or partnerships. 76 households (13.7%) were one person and 29 (5.2%) had someone living alone who was 65 or older. The average household size was 3.28.  There were 463 families (83.6% of households); the average family size was 3.58.

The age distribution was 555 people (30.5%) under the age of 18, 146 people (8.0%) aged 18 to 24, 471 people (25.9%) aged 25 to 44, 469 people (25.7%) aged 45 to 64, and 181 people (9.9%) who were 65 or older.  The median age was 34.4 years. For every 100 females, there were 104.0 males.  For every 100 females age 18 and over, there were 103.0 males.

There were 587 housing units at an average density of 175.9 per square mile, of the occupied units 449 (81.0%) were owner-occupied and 105 (19.0%) were rented. The homeowner vacancy rate was 2.8%; the rental vacancy rate was 1.9%.  1,414 people (77.6% of the population) lived in owner-occupied housing units and 402 people (22.1%) lived in rental housing units.

Utilities
Pine Canyon is served by the Little Bear Water Company.

References

Census-designated places in Monterey County, California
Census-designated places in California